Black Heart is third book in The Curse Workers, a series about Cassel Sharpe written by Holly Black.

References

External links 

 Official website

2012 American novels
Novels by Holly Black
Margaret K. McElderry books